Fussball Club Basel 1893 has a long and illustrious history, that spans the period from 1893 to the present day. Having competed at the highest level of football in Switzerland for most of this time, FCB currently play in the Swiss Super League. The club was founded on 15 November 1893.

Due to its size the history of FC Basel has been divided into five sections. This is the second section and is about the period between the two World Wars and the introduction of the Swiss Cup. FCB did not have much of an early footballing success, it took them 40 years to win their first trophy, winning the cup in 1933, as they defeated arch-rivals and reigning cup-holders Grasshopper Club Zürich in the final. For details on other individual periods of the club's history, see the following articles:

 History of FC Basel (1893–1918)
 History of FC Basel (1939–1965)
 History of FC Basel (1965–2000)
 History of FC Basel (2000–present)

The end of the First World War

Twenty-sixth season

World War I was still being fought as the Swiss season started. The club's chairman was August Rossa who took over from Franz Rinderer at the club's AGM. Otto Kuhn was team captain. Basel played a total of 30 matches in their 1918–19 season. 14 of these were in the domestic league and 16 were friendly matches. There were nine test games played in the Landhof and seven away games. Because of the war, all but one of these friendlies were played against Swiss teams. The war ended on 1 November 1918 and six months later, on 18 May 1919 Basel hosted their only foreign opponents, the German team Freiburger FC. Nine of these friendlies were won and six ended in a sporting defeat.

The domestic league, Swiss Serie A 1918–19, was divided into three regional groups, East, Central and West, each group with eight teams. FC Basel and the two other teams from Basel Nordstern and Old Boys were allocated to the Central group. The other teams playing in this group were Aarau, Luzern and Biel-Bienne and the two teams from La Chaux-de-Fonds, Étoile-Sporting and FC La Chaux-de-Fonds. FC Basel did not play a very good season, suffering six defeats. They ended the season in fifth position with 13 points.

Twenty-seventh season

The club's new chairman was Bernard Klingelfuss. Otto Kuhn was the first team's captain. Basel played a total of 44 matches in their 1919–20 season. 14 of these were in the domestic league and 30 were friendly matches. From these 30 friendlies, 15 were against foreign opponents. Five were played against German teams. Basel travelled to Germany and played against Karlsruher FV, 1. FFC Germania 1894 and 1. FC Pforzheim. During the winter break the team travelled to Italy and on Christmas day played against Genoa C.F.C., on boxing day against SG Andrea Doria and the next day against US Biellese. They also played at home against Rapid Wien. At the end of the season Basel were hosts to Victoria Hamburg, Royal Charleroi SC, Royale Union Saint-Gilloise, Budapesti EAC, Ferencvárosi TC, MTK Budapest and Wiener Amateur Sportverein. The former Hungarian international footballer Alfréd Schaffer joined Basel in April 1920 and played in 19 test matches and one league games, during which he scored a total of 27 goals.

The domestic league, Swiss Serie A 1919–20, was divided into three regional groups, the east, the central and the west group, each with eight teams. FC Basel and the two other teams from Basel Nordstern and Old Boys were allocated to the Central group. The other teams playing in this group were Aarau, Luzern and Biel-Bienne and the two teams from the capital, Young Boys and FC Bern. FC Basel played a good season, winning seven matches, drawing four and suffering just three defeats. They ended the season in second position with 18 points.

The Och Cup

Twenty-eighth, second last

The club's new chairman was Franz Rinderer who took over from Bernard Klingelfuss again. Walter Dietrich was team captain. Basel played a total of 40 matches in their 1919–20 season. 14 of these matches plus the playoff were in the domestic league and the other 25 were friendly matches. Of these 25 friendlies, 13 were played against German teams, one was against AS Strasbourg and one was against Juventus. Just before the end of the season Basel made a tour of north Germany and played three games in four days against Hannover 96, Victoria Hamburg and Kieler SV Holstein.

The domestic league, Swiss Serie A 1920–21, was divided into three regional groups, East, Central and West, each group with eight teams. FC Basel were allocated to the Central group. As opposed to the good results in the friendly games, Basel played a very bad season. Eight of the first ten games ended in a defeat, in fact the first victory was the eleventh round match against FC Bern. Basel only moved off the last position in the league table because they won the playoff against Luzern. They ended the season in second last position with just six points. They only won two championship matches, drawing two and suffering ten defeats.

Twenty-ninth season

The club's chairman was Carl Burkhardt who took over from Franz Rinderer. Basel played a total of 28 matches in their 1921–22 season. 14 of these were in the domestic league, one in the Och Cup and 13 were friendly matches. Of these 13 friendlies, seven were home games played in the Landhof and six were away games. Basel played eight of their friendly games against German opponents.

The domestic league, Swiss Serie A 1921–22, was divided into three regional groups, East, Central and West, each group with eight teams. FC Basel and the two other teams from Basel Nordstern and Old Boys were allocated to the Central group. The other teams playing in this group were Aarau, Luzern and Biel-Bienne and the two teams from the capital, Young Boys and FC Bern. FC Basel played a mediocre season, 14 matches, winning six matches, drawing three and suffering five defeats, scoring 20 goals and conceding 21. With 15 points they ended the season in third position.

In the first round of the Och Cup, that had been newly created the year before, and is considered as the forerunner to the Swiss Cup, Basel played an away game against lower tier FC Olten. Basel lost 4–0 and were eliminated. The final was played on 6 August 1922 between Basel's lower tier rivals Concordia Basel and Étoile-Sporting. Concordia won the final 1–0 to win the trophy.

Thirtieth, no Swiss champion

The club's new chairman was Karl Ibach and it was his second period as chairman. At the AGM he took over the presidency from Carl Burkhardt. For the beginning of this season the club hired the ex German international Max Breunig as trainer. He came from Karlsruher FV where he had been trainer for two seasons. Basel played a total of 32 matches in this season. 14 of these were in the domestic league and 18 were friendly matches. Of these 18 friendlies, six were home games played in the Landhof and 12 were away games. Nine test games ended in a victory, four were drawn and five ended in a defeat. In these tests Basel scored a total of 45 goals and conceded 28. Of these 18 friendlies, seven were during the winter break and one was a mid season game eight were played after the domestic league season had been completed.

After just two pre-season friendlies Basel started in the 1921–22 Swiss Serie A. The domestic league was again divided into three regional groups, East, Central and West, each group with eight teams. FC Basel and the two other teams from Basel Nordstern and Old Boys were allocated to the Central group. With 15 points they ended the season in fourth position.

There was an outrage and scandal after the 8th round match at the Landhof on 12 November 1922 against BSC Young Boys. It came to some massive disagreements between Basel manager Breunig's co-trainer Mr Sutter, the players of both teams and some fans. The Swiss Football Association started an enquiry immediately. The club Basel was fined 200 Swiss Francs, co-trainer Mr Sutter was banned for three years, Basel's player Gustav Putzendopler was banned for six months, Young Boy's players Osterwalder and von Arx were both fined 20 Swiss Francs, Referee Josef Wieland received a life long ban for the top tier of Swiss football. The club Basel had to pay the costs of the court.

Another outrage and scandal was that the team Young Boys sportingly ended the season as Central group winners. But before the start of the championship play-offs, the qualification match FC Biel-Bienne versus FC Bern (the game had ended 3–1) from 25.02.1923 was awarded 0–3 due to ineligible players of FC Biel-Bienne. So both Young Boys Bern and FC Bern were level with 22 points and consequently a play-off was to be held for the regional championship. Young Boys withdrew from this match. Thus FC Bern continued to the finals, which they won. After the play-offs finals had been completed, the qualification match Basel versus FC Bern (the game had ended 0–4) from 04.02.1923 was awarded 3–0 forfait because FC Bern had played an ineligible player. After this decision Young Boys were again winners of the regional group. The date of this decision was in September 1923 and there was not enough time left for a new Play-off Final before the next season started. Therefore no Swiss championship was awarded for 1922/23 season.

Thirty-first, a lack of goals

The club's chairman was Karl Ibach and it was his second season as chairman in his second period as chairman. The ex-German international Max Breunig was the first team trainer for the second successive season. Basel played a total of 30 matches in this season. 16 of these were in the domestic league and 14 were friendly matches. Of these 14 friendlies, three were home games played in the Landhof and 11 were away games. Seven test games ended in a victory and seven ended in a defeat. In these tests Basel scored a total of 39 goals and conceded 35. Of these friendlies, six were during the pre-season, and one was a mid-season. Because the domestic league had no real winter break the other seven were played after group stage had been completed.

There were a few modifications to the Swiss football league system, this season the number of clubs was increased from 24 to 27 teams. Again, the league was again divided into three regional groups, East, Central and West, now each group with nine teams. The last team in each group had to play a barrage against relegation. FC Basel were allocated to the Central group and now there were four teams from the city of Basel. The others being Concordia Basel, who were newly promoted, Nordstern Basel and Old Boys Basel. The further teams allocated to this group were Young Boys Bern, FC Bern, Aarau, Luzern and Biel-Bienne. Basel started their season badly, losing four of the first five games. Despite improving during the rest of the season, they could not close the gap to the leading two teams and they finished the group in third position with 18 points, seven points behind Young Boys and eight behind local rivals Nordstern who won the group and continued to the finals. East group winners Zürich won the championship, Nordstern were runners-up and West group winners Servette were third. Basel won eight of their matches, drawing two and suffered six defeats. Basel scored 16 goals and conceded 15. The problem with the bad season seems to have come because of their strikers, because the team scored just 16 goals in 16 matches. Otto Kuhn was the team's top league goal scorer in the league season with just four goals. Alfred Schlecht scored three, Heinrich Hess, Karl Putzendopler and Karl Wüthrich each scored two goals.

Thirty-second, the lack of goals continued

The club's chairman was Karl Ibach in his third successive season, in his second period as chairman. Coach Max Breunig left the club. Gustav Putzendopler was team captain this season and as captain he led the team trainings and was responsible for the line-ups. Basel played a total of 28 matches in their 1924–25 season. 16 of these were in the domestic league, and 12 were friendly matches. Of these 12 friendlies only two were played at home in the Landhof and 10 were away games, seven in Switzerland, one in Strasbourg and two in Zagreb. Only two test games ended with a victory, the other ten all ended with a defeat. In these tests Basel scored just 11 goals but they conceded 34.

This season the Serie A was again divided into three regional groups, East, Central and West, each group with nine teams. Basel were allocated to the Central group. Basel started their season well, only being defeated once in their first eleven games. They were always up with the table leaders, however at the end of the season three defeats against the other leading teams Aarau, Old Boys and lastly FC Bern, cost them their place at the top of the table. The team finished in fourth position, four points behind FC Bern, one point behind Aarau and level with Old Boys. During their league season Basel won seven of their matches, drawing five and were defeated four times. In their 16 league matches the team scored just 13 goals (the first game of the season ended 1–0, but later awarded 3–0). Emil Breh was Basel's top league goal scorer with seven goals. Breh had joined the team before the season started and left the club at the end of it. Ernst Zorzotti was the team's second top scorer with just two goals. The problem this season was also because of their strikers.

Swiss Cup

Thirty-third, the first Swiss Cup was held

The club's new chairman was Carl Burkhardt. It was Burkhardt's second period as chairman. At the AGM he took over the presidency from Karl Ibach. The club did not have a head coach, but Karl Bielser was first team captain this season and as captain he led the team trainings and was responsible for the line-ups. Basel played a total of 33 matches in their 1925–26 season. 16 of these were in the domestic league, two were in the newly created Swiss Cup and 15 were friendly matches. Of these 15 friendlies four were played at home in the Landhof and 11 were away games, five in Switzerland and three each in France and Germany. Four of these games were won, four draws and seven defeats. 29 goals were scored, but 32 were conceded. During these friendly games, a highlight was the fixture in the Landhof as Huddersfield Town visited. Huddersfield had just won the English Football League championship for the third consecutive season. The game attracted 3,500 supporters. Basel lost the match against the English champions by five goals to one.

As in the previous seasons, this's season the Serie A was divided into three regional groups, each group with nine teams. Basel were allocated to the Central group together with local clubs Concordia Basel, Nordstern Basel and Old Boys Basel. The other teams allocated to this group were Young Boys Bern, FC Bern, Aarau, Grenchen and the newly promoted Solothurn. Basel visited the group newcomers for the first match and promptly lost 1–2. Following this initial shock, the team played twelve games in succession undefeated. However, only six of these games were won and six were drawn and at this point, despite having defeated the league leaders Young Boys, they were trailing by five points. Basel lost their last two home games and thus ended the season in second position. During their league season Basel won seven of their matches, drawing six and were defeated three times. They were nine points adrift of Young Boys, who continued to the finals. Servette won the championship, Grasshopper Club were runners-up and YB were classified third. In their 16 league matches the team scored 26 goals and conceded 14. Arnold Hürzeler, who had joined the team for this season, was the team's top league goal scorer with eight goals. He left the club after the season. Karl Bielser was second best league scorer with seven goals.

The very first Swiss Cup tournament was organised this season by the Swiss Football Association (and has been organised by them annually since then). In the first round Basel were drawn against lower tier FC Horgen and the game took place on 4 October 1925. Basel won their first cup match 8–1 and Arnold Hürzeler proved his goal scoring qualities by securing the victory for his team by scoring six of the goals. In the next round, however, Basel were eliminated against Aarau, after a draw, by toss of a coin. Grasshopper Club won the first Swiss Cup.

Thirty-fourth season

The club's new chairman was Franz Rinderer. It was Rinderer's third period as chairman. He took over the presidency from Carl Burkhardt at the AGM. Karl Bielser was team captain for the second season in a row and again he led the team trainings and was responsible for the line-ups. Basel played a total of 32 matches in their 1926–27 season. 16 of these were in the domestic league, one was in the Swiss Cup and 15 were friendly matches. Of these 15 friendlies only two were played at home in the Landhof and 13 were away games, six in Switzerland, five in France and two in Germany. Eight of these games were won, one was drawn and six ended with a defeat. The team scored 33 goals in these friendlies, but conceded 37.

As in the previous year, this's season the Serie A was divided into three regional groups, each group with nine teams. Basel were allocated to the Central group together with local clubs Concordia Basel, Nordstern Basel and Old Boys Basel. The other teams allocated to this group were Young Boys Bern, FC Bern, Aarau, Grenchen and Solothurn. Basel played a mediocre season, winning eight matches, drawing three and suffering five defeats, scoring 29 goals and conceding 26. With 19 points they ended the season in fourth position. Grasshopper Club won the championship.

In the round of 64 in the Swiss Cup Basel were drawn against Old Boys, but were eliminated in this round because they lost the match 0–2. Grasshopper Club won the cup.

Thirty-fifth season

The club's new chairman was Karl Junker took over the presidency from Carl Burkhardt at the AGM on 8 July 1927. However Junker only remained as president until 15 September, then Karl Ibach took over for his third period. Karl Bielser was team captain for the third season in a row and again as captain he led the team trainings and was responsible for the line-ups. During the season Peter Riesterer took over as team captain and he acted as team coach from then onwards. Basel played a total of 27 matches in their 1927–28 season. 16 of these were in the domestic league, one was in the Swiss Cup and 10 were friendly matches. Of these 10 friendlies four were played at home in the Landhof and six were away games. Apart from the away game against Mulhouse all other matches were in Switzerland. The team won four of the friendly games and lost the other six. They scored 20 goals and conceded 26.

The 1927–28 Swiss Serie A was divided into three regional groups, each group with nine teams. Basel were allocated to the Central group. Basel played a good season, won ten matches, one was drawn and they suffered five defeats. Basel scored 27 goals and conceded 21. With 21 points they ended the season in third position, two points behind group winners and local rivals Nordstern. Nordstern advanced to the finals. Grasshopper Club won the championship, Nordstern were runner-up and Étoile Carouge were third.

In this season's Swiss Cup Basel were drawn against Young Fellows Zürich in the first round and were eliminated because they lost 0–1.

Thirty-sixth season

The club's new chairman was Hans Rupprecht who took over the presidency from Karl Ibach at the AGM on 7 July 1928. The former  Hungarian international footballer Gyula Kertész was appointed as coach/manager at the beginning of the 1928–29 Serie A season. After Percy Humphreys (1913–14) and Max Breunig (1922–23), Kertész was just the third professional trainer that the club had engaged up until this point. The decision to employ a professional football trainer/manager was made because FC Basel had slipped well below the level of their local rivals Nordstern, who had qualified for the finals three times in the last five years. Basel played a total of 29 matches in their 1928–29 season. 16 of these were in the domestic league, three were in the Swiss Cup and 10 were friendly matches. Of these 10 friendlies three were played at home in the Landhof and seven were away games. Apart from the away game against Mulhouse all other matches were in Switzerland. Basel scored 24 goals in these friendlies and conceded 32.

The 1928–29 Swiss Serie A was divided into three regional groups, each group with nine teams. Basel were allocated to the Central group together with the other three local clubs. This season was a very competitive one. After a defeat against YB in the first match, it was obvious that a professional coach was at work, because the team won eight of the next ten matches. The team rose to the top of the table, thanks to the good goal scoring of their best forwards Alfred Schlecht, Karl Bielser and Alfred Enderlin. But then, an unawaited 1–4 home defeat against lower placed local rivals Concordia changed everything. In the last five matches Basel managed only three draws and were defeated twice. The top five teams ended the season within four points of each other and each team won eight of their 16 matches. With 20 points Basel ended the season in second position, just one point behind group winners Young Boys, who advanced to the finals and then won the championship. Basel scored 48 league goals and conceded 32. Karl Bielser was the team's top league goalscorer with 15 goals, Alfred Schlecht was second top scorer with 14 goals and Alfred Enderlin scored nine.

In the Swiss Cup Basel were drawn against Baden in the preliminary round, against Bülach in the first round, but were eliminated by Concordia Basel in the second round. Concordia continued the competition and reached the semi-final, there losing to Urania Genève Sport, who won the final against Young Boys 1–0, which was played in the Stade de Frontenex in Geneva.

Thirty-seventh, advanced to final round

The club's new chairman was former player Otto Kuhn who took over the presidency from Hans Rupprecht at the club's AGM on 6 July 1929. The former  Hungarian international footballer Gyula Kertész was coach/manager for the second successive season. He coached the team in a total of 41 matches in their 1929–30 season. 20 of these matches were in the domestic league, 16 in the qualification round and four in the final round. Four matches were in the Swiss Cup and 17 games were friendly matches. Of these 17 friendlies three were played at home in the Landhof and the other 14 were away games. Of the 41 matches, 25 ended in a victory, six were drawn and 10 were defeats, 132 goals scored and 75 against.

The 1929–30 Swiss Serie A was divided into three regional groups, each group with nine teams. Due to the modification in the league system in the following season, the number of teams per group is to be increased from nine to eleven and therefore there were a few other small modifications this season. Basel played a good league season. The good work that the trainer Gyula Kertész was making with the players, was shown in the results. The first five games were won straight off, including a 5–1 in Solothurn, a 4–1 against both FC Bern and Grenchen, a 3–0 against Aarau and a 1–0 victory against local rivals Old Boys. There was a slip in the match against there closest rivals Young Boys. But the team continued their good run in the new year, beating Solothurn 4–1 and even managing a 9–2 against FC Bern. Alfred Enderlin scored four goals in that match. Basel won ten matches, four were drawn and they suffered only two defeats. They scored 46 goals and conceded 20. With 24 points they ended the group in top position, two points ahead of runners-up Young Boys.

FCB and YB continued to the final group. Here Basel played against Biel-Bienne and won, but lost the three matches against Lugano, Grasshopper Club and finally Servette, who won the Swiss championship. Basel finished the championship in fourth position, level on points with Lugano and YB.

In the preliminary, first and second round of the Swiss Cup Basel were drawn at home against FC Diana Zürich in August and FC Dietikon in October, then away against Lugano in November. But their second visit to the canton of Ticino in December ended in the away defeat against FC Locarno.

Thirty-eighth, advanced to final round again

The club's chairman was former player Otto Kuhn for the second successive year. Former player Gustav Putzendopler was appointed as new coach/manager, succeeding Gyula Kertész who had moved on to Hamburger SV. Putzendopler coached the team in a total of 31 matches in their 1930–31 season. 23 of these matches were in the domestic league, 19 in the qualification round and four in the final round. Further, one match was in the Swiss Cup and seven games were friendly matches. Of these seven friendlies three were played at home in the Landhof, one other game was played in Switzerland, two in Germany and one in Mulhouse. Of the friendly games two were won, two were drawn and three ended with a defeat. Of the entire 31 matches, 15 ended with a victory, five with a draw and there were 11 defeats.

The 1930–31 Swiss Serie A was divided into three regional groups, new each group with 11 teams, this due to the larger modification in the league system in the next season. Basel were allocated to the Central group together with the other local clubs Concordia Basel, Nordstern Basel and Old Boys Basel and newly promoted Black Stars Basel. The other six teams allocated to this group were Young Boys Bern, FC Bern, Aarau, Grenchen and Solothurn and newly promoted FC Luzern.

Basel played a good league season, out of the first nine games resulted just one defeat. The games in the new year were somewhat more problematic. In the last game of the season a defeat against Nordstern nearly cost them their place within the top two, because now these two teams were level on points. Basel and Nordstern had to play a barrage and put themselves through to the final by winning two goals to one. Leopold Kielholz was the team's top league goal scorer with 19 goals.

In the preliminary round of the Swiss Cup Basel were drawn at home against FC Locarno and the lost the game after extra time. The game had ended 2–2 after 90 minutes, after 120 minutes the score was 4–4 and so a further 2x 15 minutes were played. The final score was 4–5 and the winning goal was scored in the 150 minute.

Thirty-ninth season 

The club's new chairman Franz Rinderer, who took over the presidency from Otto Kuhn at the AGM on 11 July 1931. Last season's coach/manager Austrian Gustav Putzendopler stayed on for his second season as trainer. Fellow Austrian international Otto Haftl signed in from AC Sparta Prague to the team becoming Basel's first ever foreign fully professional football player. During his first season at the club he also acted as player-manager after Putzendopler laid down the job as trainer. The team played a total of 35 matches in their 1931–32 season. 16 of these matches were in the domestic league, six matches in the Swiss Cup and 13 games were friendly matches. Of these 13 friendlies four were played in the Landhof, six other games were also played in Switzerland. Only one was played in Germany against FV Lörrach and another one was played in France against CA Mulhouse. Of the friendly games, ten games ended with a victory, two were drawn and one match ended with a defeat.

The newly formed and renamed domestic league, now Nationalliga, started at the end of August. The new 1931–32 Nationalliga was now divided into two groups, each with nine teams, coming from the whole of Switzerland and no longer just regional groups. The top team in each group would advance to the finals. The two second placed teams would have a play-off to decide the third final place and the curiosity this season the second tier champions would also qualify to the finals. Basel were allocated to Group 1. The league season started very badly, they lost their first five games straight off, conceding 27 goals. Not only did Basel change their trainer, but they also changed their goalkeeper and various players. In the second half of the season things improved and with six victories in the last seven games Basel were able to rise from the foot of the table. They finished the season four points above the relegation zone. Zürich were group 1 winners and as second placed Urania Genève Sport won the play-off against Biel-Bienne, these two teams advanced to the finals with group 2 winners Grasshopper Club. As mentioned the second tier champions were also qualified for the finals, this being Lausanne-Sport. After the four teams had each played their three games, Zürich and Lausanne were then level, each with four points and a play-off decided the championship. The curiosity that a second tier team would become Swiss champions happened, because Lausanne won the play-off 5–2.

In the first principal round of the Swiss Cup Basel were drawn away against and defeated lower classed SC Veltheim. They needed a reply in the second round to beat Lugano and were victorious against lower classed SC Brühl St. Gallen in the third round. Then a quarter-final victory over La Chaux-de-Fonds took the team into a semi-final against Grasshopper Club. However this ended with a rather hefty defeat 1–8 and that fits completely into the picture of a rather disappointing season. The Grasshoppers won the final 5–1 against Urania Genève Sport.

Fortieth, first national trophy

Basel did not have much of an early footballing success, waiting 40 years before winning their first trophy.

The club's chairman Franz Rinderer was confirmed at the AGM for the second consecutive period. At the beginning of the season the Austrian former international Karl Kurz was appointed as new head coach. The previous season Kunz had been head coach for FC Grenchen. He took over as club trainer from player-manager Otto Haftl who continued with the team as player. Basel played a total of 39 matches in their 1932–33 season. 15 of these matches were in the domestic league Nationalliga, seven in the Challenge National, six matches in the Swiss Cup and 11 matches were friendlies. Of these 11 friendly matches seven were played in the Landhof, two other games were also played in Switzerland and two were played in a tournament in Luxembourg. Of the friendly games, six games ended with a victory, one was drawn and four matches ended with a defeat. The team scored 42 goals and conceded 27.

A curiosity in this season was that in the middle the national championships there was an intermediate championship called Challenge National (Championnat intermédiaire). The competition participants were divided into two groups, with encounters between the two groups taking place among themselves. The winners of both groups were to play the final. The games were played in the winter months between November and February. Basel were allocated to group 1 Basel and finished in fifth position. Group 1 was won by Grasshopper Club but the Challenge National championship was won by the BSC Young Boys.

In the 36th Swiss championship 1932–33 Nationalliga was also divided into two groups. This year with eight teams in each group, coming from the whole of Switzerland and no longer just regional groups. Same curiosity as the previous season, the second tier champions would also qualify to the finals. Basel were allocated to Group 1 and finished in second position in the table, with seven victories and four draws from 14 games. With 18 points they were five behind group winner Grasshopper Club who advanced with group 2 winners Young Boys to the finals. Second tier (1st League) champions were FC Bern and they also advanced to the finals. The cross-over play-off game between the second placed teams from each group was played in Basel in the Stadion Rankhof. But Basel lost 3–4 against Servette, despite the fact that Otto Haftl scored a hat-trick. As last team Servette advanced to the finals, which they finished level on points with Grasshoppers. Servette won the play-off match between these two teams and became champions.

In the Swiss Cup first round Basel were drawn at home in the Landhof against local team Concordia Basel, who in the meantime had been relegated to the third highest league. Basel won 4–2 and advanced to the next round. They played and won 3–0 at home against Blue Stars Zürich. In the third round Basel played away against AC Bellinzona and won 2–3 after extra time. The quarter-final was played at home against Lugano and was won 4–2. In the semi-final Basel were drawn with a home match against Lausanne-Sport. In another high scoring game Basel managed a 5–3 victory. Basel advanced to the Final, which was played in the Hardturm in Zürich. Twice Otto Haftl, once Alfred Jaeck and once Walter Müller scored the four goals for Basel. Basel won 4–3 defeating arch-rivals and reigning cup-holders Grasshoppers in what is still considered to be one of the best cup finals in Swiss football history. This was their first ever national title, apart from the Anglo-Cup in 1913 which was a forerunner to the Swiss Cup.

Forty-first, Karl Kurz

The club chairman Franz Rinderer, who was the president for the third consecutive period. The Austrian trainer Karl Kurz remained head coach for his second season and fellow Austrian Josef Haist was is co-trainer. Kurz was ill with leukaemia and his condition worsened. He died because of his illness during the evening of 26 November 1933, only hours the team's victory in the away game against Blue Stars Zürich. He was 35 years old. Josef Haist then took over the job as head coach. Basel played a total of 46 matches in their 1933–34 season. 30 of these matches were in the domestic league Nationalliga, four in the Swiss Cup and 12 were friendly matches. Of these 12 friendlies seven were played in the Landhof, three other games were also played in Switzerland and three were played in France. Of the friendly games, seven ended with a victory and four ended with a defeat.

The 1933–34 Nationalliga was reformed. The top division was no longer divided into two groups, but for the first time, all teams were in one group. The second tier league remained with two regional groups. The championship was contested by 16 teams and was played in a double round robin. Basel started the season well, winning six of the first nine games, suffering only one defeat. Following the death of trainer Kurz the team was disorientated, losing five of the next seven matches and thus losing contact with the two top teams. Then in March Basel caught their form and improved again to finish their Nationalliga season in fifth position in the table, with 15 victories from the 30 games and 36 points. Servette won the championship with 49 points.

In the first principal round of the Swiss Cup Basel were drawn at home against and defeated lower tier Solothurn. In the second round away against Lausanne-Sport winning 3–1 and third round at home against local rivals Nordstern Basel winning by three goals to one. Then in the quarter-final on 4 February 1934 Basel were defeated by Locarno and that fits, timely, completely into the entire picture of the season's evolution. Grasshopper Club won the cup beating Servette 2–0.

Forty-second season

The club chairman Franz Rinderer, who was the president for the fourth consecutive season. The Austrian trainer Richard (Dombi) Kohn was appointed as the new FC Basel trainer. He followed his fellow Austrian Josef Haist, who had taken over after the death of Karl Kurz during the previous season. The team played a total of 38 matches in their 1934–35 season. 26 of these matches were in the Nationalliga, five matches were in the Swiss Cup and seven were friendly matches. Of these seven friendlies six were played in the Landhof and the other game was played away against Luzern. Of theses matches four ended with a victory. However the visiting teams Racing Club Paris, Manchester City and Rapid Wien proved to be too strong for the home team.

The 1934–35 Nationalliga had been again reformed. The number of teams had been reduced by two teams. The championship was contested by 14 teams and was played in a double round robin. Basel started the season well, winning nine of the first eleven games. However the second half of the season was not that good and the team slipped in the table. They finished the Nationalliga season in fifth position in the table, with 12 victories from the 26 games and 28 points. They were 13 points behind Lausanne-Sport, who won the championship.

In the first principal round of the Swiss Cup Basel were drawn away against and defeated lower tier Bellinzona. In both the second and third round Basel were drawn at home against lower classed St. Gallen and Chiasso. The quarter-final was won at home against Lugano. In the semi-final Basel were drawn away against local rivals Nordstern Basel, but suffered a defeat. Lausanne-Sport won the final against Nordstern 10–0 and therefore they completed the national double.

Forty-third season

Franz Rinderer was again voted as the club chairman and this was his fifth consecutive season as club president. Alwin Riemke was appointed as new team manager. He followed Richard (Dombi) Kohn who had moved on to manage Feyenoord. Riemke came from Lausanne-Sport, who had won the double in the previous Nationalliga championship season and the Cup. Riemke acted as player-manager and played four matches during the season. Basel played a total of 38 matches in their 1935–36 season. 26 of these matches were in the Nationalliga, one in the Swiss Cup and 11 were friendly matches. Of these 11 friendlies six were played at home and the others all in Switzerland. Of theses 11 friendly matches seven ended with a victory, one was drawn and three ended in a defeat.

The 1935–36 Nationalliga was contested by 14 teams and was played in a double round robin. Basel played a very mediocre season and ended the championship in 10th position. They won just eight of their 26 games and with 20 points ended the season 21 points behind Lausanne-Sport who won the championship for the second consecutive season. In the 1st principal round of the Swiss Cup Basel were drawn at home in the Landhof against lower tier Luzern. But they were defeated and thus knocked out. Young Fellows Zürich won the cup.

Forty-fourth, play-off against relegation

Emil Junker was the new club chairman and it was his second period as chairman, after his short period in 1927. Junker took over as club president from Franz Rinderer. Heinz Körner was appointed as new team manager. He followed Alwin Riemke who moved to Germany to manage SpVgg Greuther Fürth. Körner had been manager of Aarau the previous season. He was the tenth professional team manager/trainer in Basel's history, their tenth foreign trainer. How long Körner stayed with the club is not clearly stated, but he left during the season, and afterwards Fernand Jaccard took over as player-manager. Jaccard was the club's first professional Swiss trainer. Basel played a total of 40 matches in their 1936–37 season. 26 of these matches were in the Nationalliga, one in the Swiss Cup and 13 were friendly matches. Of these 13 friendlies eight were played at home in the Landhof, three others in Switzerland and one each as visitors to RC Strasbourg and to SC Freiburg.

Further league reforms took place before the season started. The number of teams in the 1936–37 Nationalliga was reduced by one team, thus contested by 13 teams and played as round-robin. Two teams were to be relegated and only one promoted to reduce the number of teams to 12 the following year. Basel played a very poor and un-consistent season. Only thanks to four consecutive victories towards the end of the campaign lifted the team to finish in joint second last position in the league table. Because La Chaux-de-Fonds and Basel both had 20 points, they had to have a play-off against relegation. This ended in a draw and so a replay was required. The replay was played in the Stadion Neufeld in Bern on 20 June 1937 and ended in a 1–0 victory for Basel and so they prevented relegation at the last possible moment.

In the 1st principal round of the Swiss Cup Basel were drawn at home in the Landhof against lower tier Concordia Basel and were defeated and knocked out of the competition. Grasshopper Club won both championship and cup.

Forty-fifth season

Emil Junker was the club chairman and it was his second consecutive season as president. Fernand Jaccard who had taken over as first team coach during the previous season stayed on as player-manager this season. Basel played a total of 33 matches in their 1937–38 season. 22 of these matches were in the Nationalliga, three in the Swiss Cup and eight were friendly matches. Of these eight friendlies six were played at home in the Landhof, one in Espenmoos as guests to FC St. Gallen and one as guests to Le Havre AC in the north of France. Four of the friendlies were won, one was drawn and three ended with a defeat.

The number of teams in the 1937–38 Nationalliga was reduced by one team in comparison to the previous season. Thus 12 teams contested the championship this year, which was played as a round-robin, one team to be relegated and only one promoted from the two 1. Liga groups. Basel played an even and consistent season. 22 league games in total, 12 of them ended with a victory, three ended in a draw and the team suffered seven defeats. With 27 points Basel ended the season in fourth position, three points less than Lugano who became Swiss champions. The young forward Numa Monnard, who had transferred in at the beginning of the season from Cantonal Neuchatel, was the team's top goal scorer. With 20 goals he was the Nationalliga top scorer as well. He played 21 league games and in each of his first eight games he scored at least one goal. In total, including cup and friendlies, Monnard played 29 games for Basel, in which he netted 34 times.

In the first principal round of the Swiss Cup, as Basel played against lower tier FC Breite, Numa Monnard scored five times. In the next cup round Monard scored a hat-trick against Bellinzona. However, in the round of 16 Basel lost 0–1 against Grasshopper Club, who then proceeded and eventually won the cup.

Forty-sixth, relegation

Emil Junker was the club chairman and it was his third consecutive season as club president. The club had financial and sporting problems over the previous few years and these continued this season. Fernand Jaccard who had been Basel's player-manager the previous season, continued for the club in the same position this season. Basel played a total of 29 matches in their 1938–39 season. 22 of these matches were in the Nationalliga, two in the Swiss Cup and five were friendly matches. Of these five friendlies two were played at home in the Landhof and the other three were also in Switzerland. Two friendly games were won, two drawn and one ended in a defeat.

According to statements in the 75th anniversary book written years later by author Jules Düblin (ex-player and ex-club chairman) the club had problems with the Swiss Football Association (ASF-SFA). The club was also having financial problems and these problems continued this season. The club suffered under the results of this confrontation with the ASF-SFA. These were mainly due to the transfer of the player Numa Monnard, who at the start of the season returned to his former club Cantonal Neuchatel.

12 teams contested the 1938–39 Nationalliga championship, which was played as a round-robin, one team to be relegated. The league season did not mean it well with FCB. Despite the fact that the players were well prepared for the season, as Düblin wrote in his summary, sportingly the season was very bad. Despite two victories over the two top clubs that season, Grasshopper Club and Grenchen, one catastrophic game followed the other. Of the 22 domestic league games only five ended with a win, 12 were defeats. The team ended in last position, two points behind Biel-Bienne and the Young Boys. Basel was relegated for the first time in the club history into the newly reorganized 1.Liga.

In the first principal round of the Swiss Cup Basel were drawn at home against lower tier local rivals Concordia Basel and won 3–2. In the second round Basel were also drawn at home against a lower-tier team, but Brühl St. Gallen proved to be a strong competitor and Basel were defeated 1–3 and were thrown out of the competition.

See also
FC Basel
List of FC Basel players
List of FC Basel seasons
Football in Switzerland
:Category:FC Basel
:Category:FC Basel players

References

Sources
 Die ersten 125 Jahre / 2018. Publisher: Josef Zindel im Friedrich Reinhardt Verlag, Basel. 
 FC Basel Archiv / Verein "Basler Fussballarchiv”

External links
 Official Website
 Rotblau.ch Statistik Website
 FC Basel Fan club website
 http://www.football.ch

FC Basel
Basel